The Adventures of William Tell is a British swashbuckler adventure series, first broadcast on the ITV network in 1958, and produced by ITC Entertainment.  In the United States, the episodes aired on the syndicated NTA Film Network in 1958–1959.

William Tell is a folk hero of Switzerland, supposedly active in the early 14th century. He supposedly encouraged the population of the Old Swiss Confederacy to revolt against the regime of Albert I of Germany (reigned 1298–1308). Tell's legend is recorded in the White Book of Sarnen (1474).

Cast

Main
 Conrad Phillips as William Tell
 Jennifer Jayne as Hedda Tell (wife)
 Richard Rogers as Walter Tell (son)
 Willoughby Goddard as Landburgher Gessler
 Nigel Green as The Bear
 Jack Lambert as Judge Furst (Hedda's father)
 Peter Hammond as Hofmanstahl

Notable actors appearing

Production
The series was produced by Ralph Smart, who wrote a number of stories for the series and also created and produced Danger Man. The show was made at the National Studios in Elstree.

The outdoor scenes were filmed around the mountains and lakes of Snowdonia in Wales. The film base and make-up were at a small farm in Cwm-y-glo in Snowdonia. This is beside Llyn Padarn, a lake which can be seen in many shots (as can cars on the A4086 road on the opposite side of the lake!). The crew used to walk up the mountain from their base, as there was no vehicle access, and brought work for at least three yearly shoots to a tiny corner of North Wales before tourism took off.

An accident early occurred to the star, Conrad Phillips, during filming in Snowdonia. He was asked to keep stepping back until he stepped off a 12-foot drop, injuring his knee – which eventually led to his retirement from acting. Phillips had to wear support bandages during filming but sometimes forgot, causing him to struggle with some action scenes.

Daily rushes were viewed at the only cinema in the area, at Llanberis, which was taken over from 8.00 until noon every morning. The film was taken to Soho in London for developing and the rushes returned to Llanberis by 8.30 next morning.

Although all three series had location scenes, the third was more studio based and location scenes were mostly taken from unused and reused stock shots from the first and second series. A smaller crew went to Wales for this series and more money was saved by shooting without synchronised sound. In the days of enforced demarcation, this saved several technicians' wages.

Though in some ways the same as The Adventures of Robin Hood, a brave bowman fighting against a tyrant, this was a harder show with crossbow bolts killing people and Tell fighting hand-to-hand, which often resulted in the death of the bad guy. Unlike the courtly Sheriff of Nottingham, Gessler was a pig of a man, unshaven, often eating or drinking without manners and throwing his metaphorical as well as literal weight around. Nevertheless, the interaction between the hero and the Sheriff and Land burger respectively, was a strong point in both series, bringing out the quality diction and crispness of both Alan Wheatley's and Willoughby Goddard's acting. In contrast, the absence of a regular enemy in the TV series Sir Francis Drake weakened that series.
The Adventures of William Tell series was repeated well into the 1960s. In June 2020 the series began a rerun on the British Talking Pictures TV channel.

Music
The series featured a long-remembered theme song, with music based on the William Tell Overture by Gioachino Rossini. For the show, the song lyrics were by Harold Purcell and were sung by David Whitfield.

Because this portion of Rossini's overture was the theme of The Lone Ranger in the United States, a different portion of the overture, with lyrics added, became the theme song there, titled: The Freedom Song – "Marching Behind William Tell" by Geoffrey Parsons. This is on The Network DVD episode Castle of Fear.

Incidental music was by Albert Elms and Sydney John Kay.

Lyrics

1. Come away, come away with William Tell,
Come away to the land he loved so well;
What a day, what a day when the apple fell,
For Tell and Switzerland

2. Come away with Tell to the mountainside
Look down to the pass where the tyrants ride.
Fit a bolt to your bow and down they go,
For Tell and Switzerland

3. We are simple peasant folk
We will not bear a foreign yoke
Our freedom song will echo on
To fight for what is right.

4. Hurry on, hurry on, there's a dungeon cell;
Hurry on, hurry on, there's a noose as well;
But we'll escape from the jaws of hell
For Tell and Switzerland.

5. We lived our lives, we loved our friends,
We never wanted more.
We had the skill to plough and till,
But not the art of war,
But now the tyrant from the plains
Steals up to take our lands,
Instead of spade we wield the blade
Our life is in our hands.

6. Follow on, follow on, at the leader's heel
With a thrust of a pike and a clash of steel
Follow on with the fight till the tyrants reel
For Tell and Switzerland.

7. Give 'em one for the day they burned the grain,
Give 'em two for the night that Fritz was slain,
Give 'em three, give 'em four and hooray for more,
For Tell and Switzerland.

8. The shepherd's crook, the reaping hook
Has taken on a warlike look.
With blades we've beaten from the plough
We'll reap a harvest now.

9. Come away, come away with William Tell,
Come away to the land he loved so well
Fit a bolt to your bow, and away we go
For Te-e-e-ell, and Switzerland.

Verses 1, 2, 4 with the opening titles, 6, 7, 8, 9 with the closing credits.

Episodes
Airdate is for ATV Midlands. ITV regions varied date and order.

Home media
The entire series is available on a 5-disc region 2 DVD set from Network Distributing Ltd Home Entertainment/Granada Ventures in 2007. The complete series is also available on a 3-disc region 1 DVD set.

Related series
Conrad Phillips later played William Tell's sidekick, Stefan, in the series Crossbow which ran from August 1987 till February 1989. William Tell was played by Will Lyman. The series ran for 72 thirty-minute colour episodes over three seasons, 24 each, with the third season unaired in America. Other members of the cast were Jeremy Clyde as Hermann Gessler, Valentine Pelka as Roland, Melinda Mullins as Blade and David Barry Gray as
Tell's son Matthew.

There was a series derived from William Tell in New Zealand entitled The Legend of William Tell, which lasted one season of 16 episodes of sixty minutes from August till December 1998. In the cast were Kieren Hutchison as William Tell, Andrew Binns as Xax, Nathaniel Lees as Leon, Katrina Browne as Aruna, Ray Henwood as Kreel, Sharon Tyrell as Kalem, Beth Allen as Princess Varga and Drew Neemia as Drogo.

References

External links
 
 "William Tell" (1958–59) – episode guide at The Classic TV Archive
 Modern review of the series
 TelevisionHeaven.com

1958 British television series debuts
1959 British television series endings
1950s British drama television series
British adventure television series
Television series by ITC Entertainment
Television series set in the 14th century
Television shows set in Switzerland
Cultural depictions of William Tell
Black-and-white British television shows
English-language television shows
Television shows shot at ATV Elstree Studios